Sukanta Bhattacharya (15 August 1926 – 13 May 1947) was a Bengali poet and playwright.

He was called 'Young Nazrul' and 'Kishore Bidrohi Kobi', a reference to the great rebel poet Kazi Nazrul Islam for Sukanta's similar rebellious stance against the tyranny of the British Raj and the oppression by the social elites through the work of his poetry. He died from tuberculosis, three months before India achieved independence.

Works

As a poet as well as a Marxist he wielded his pen against the Second World War, the famine of 1943, fascist aggression, communal riots etc. His poems, which describe the sufferings of the common people and their struggle for existence, look forward to an exploitation-free society. His poetry books are:

 Chharpatra (ছাড়পত্র) (1948) 
 Ghum Nei (ঘুম নেই) (1950)
 Purbabhas (পূর্বাভাস) (1950)
 Abhijan (অভিযান) (1953)
 Mithe-Kadha (মিঠে-কড়া) (1951)
 Hartal (হরতাল) (1962)
 Giti Guccha (গীতিগুচ্ছ) (1965)

His works are deeply marked and influenced by his communist experience.

An excerpt from his poem Durmor (দুর্মর) signifies his love and passion towards his country.

সাবাস বাংলাদেশ!
এ পৃথিবী অবাক তাকিয়ে রয়
জ্বলে পুড়ে মরে ছারখার
তবু মাথা নোয়াবার নয়।
Meaning in English: "Bravo Bangladesh! The world is amazed! fired, burned, died and destroyed, but never gave up!" Here 'Bangladesh' refers to the 'Undivided Bengal'.

Collections
 His complete writings were anthologised in Sukanta Samagra (সুকান্ত সমগ্র) (Complete Works of Sukanta) (1967), published by the Saraswat Library, Kolkata was edited by Subhash Mukhopadhyay. This includes all the printed texts, some lesser known writings, his plays and stories, which include Khudha (Hunger), Durboddho (Incomprehensible), Bhadralok (Gentleman) and Daradi Kishorer Svapna (Dream of a Compassionate Adolescent), an article, Chhanda O Abritti and also a selection of letters. It was published posthumously from both West and East Bengal.
 Patra Guchha (পত্রগুচ্ছ) (Letters).

References

External links

 
 
 
 Sukanta Bhattacharya at The Archive of Fine Arts
 Sukanta Bhattacharya's PRARTHI translated by Osman Gani
 Works of Sukanta Bhattacharya
 Sukanta Bhattacharya Poem List

Bengali writers
Bengali-language writers
20th-century Bengali poets
Bengali-language poets
1926 births
1947 deaths
Writers from Kolkata
20th-century Indian poets
Bengali male poets
20th-century Indian male writers
20th-century deaths from tuberculosis
Tuberculosis deaths in India